The Nationale 1 Masculin (abbreviated as NM1; in English: National 1 Men) is the highest professional basketball league in Senegal. Established in 1971, the league consists of 16 teams. 

Each season is finished with a final in a single-game elimination format, held at the Marius Ndiaye Stadium in Dakar. AS Douanes and ASFA are the most successful team in NM1 history with 10 won titles each. 

The champions of the NM1 qualify directly for the regular season of the Basketball Africa League (BAL), the premiere continental league.

Teams
The following 16 teams play in the 2022 season:

Champions
This is a list of the champions of the Senegalese championship:

2022: AS Douanes
2021: DUC Dakar
2020: None
2019 : Douanes
2018 : Douanes
2017 : Douanes
2016 : Douanes
2015 : DUC
2014 : Douanes
2013 : DUC 
2012 : UGB 
2011 : Douanes 
2010 : DUC 
2009 : DUC 
2008 : Douanes 
2007 : Douanes 
2006 : Rail 
2005 : Rail 
2004 : Bopp
2003 : Gorée 
2002 : JA 
2001 : Bopp 
2000 : Gorée
1999 : Bopp 
1998 : Douanes 
1997 : JA 
1996 : JA 
1995 : ASFA 
1994 : ASFA 
1993 : Bopp 
1992 : JA 
1991 : Gorée 
1990 : JA 
1989 : Gorée 
1988 : SEIB 
1987 : JA 
1986 : JA 
1985 : Gorée
1984 : ASFA 
1983 : Police 
1982 : Police 
1981 : Police 
1980 : ASFA 
1979 : ASFA 
1978 : ASFA 
1977 : ASFA 
1976 : ASFA 
1975 : ASFA 
1974 : ASFA 
1973 : Dial Diop 
1972 : Dial Diop 
1971 : Gorée

Recent finals
The finals were originally played in a single-game format. In 2022, the league switched to a best-of-three series format.

Performance by club 
Teams shown in italics are no longer in existence.

Individual awards

King of the Season 
The King of the Season award (in French: Roi du Saison) is given each year to the best performing player of the NM1 season. Since 2014, the awards were re-named to the Most valuable player awards, in line with International practice.

Revelation of the Year

Coach of the Year

Notable players 

 Louis Adams
 Brancou Badio
 Bamba Diallo
 Pape Moustapha Diop
 Mamadou Faye
 Alkaly Ndour
 Mamadou N'Doye
 Thierno Niang

References

External links
AfroBasket.com League Page

 
Basketball competitions in Senegal
Basketball leagues in Africa